Ghosting may refer to:

Common uses
 Ghosting (identity theft), a form of identity theft, whereby a person takes on the identity of a deceased person
 Ghosting (incarceration), repeatedly moving a prisoner through different institutions to avoid scrutiny, or because the prisoner has become unmanageable
 Ghosting (behavior), ending all communication and contact with another person without any apparent warning or justification
 Ghosting (television), a double image when receiving a distorted or multipath input signal in analog television broadcasting
 Ghosting, an offset printing defect produced in one of two ways, in which faint replicas of printed images appear in undesirable places
 Comment ghosting, a form of stealth banning on internet forums
 Key ghosting, a phenomenon where multiple simultaneous key presses on a computer keyboard can result in incorrectly registered keystrokes
 Lens flare, an optical effect caused by internal reflections
 Multiple appearances of the same object in High dynamic range imaging, where multiple images are merged into one.

Arts, entertainment, and media
 Ghosting (strategy), a way of playing a video game that emphasizes stealthiness
 Ghosting, a form of cheating in online games
 "Ghosting", a song by the band Mother Mother from their album O My Heart

See also
 Ghost (disambiguation)
 Ghost image (disambiguation)
 Ghostin (disambiguation)
 Ghostwriting, the practice of producing written material that is credited to another person

de:Geisterbild